Amjad Farooqi (– September 26, 2004), alias Amjad Hussain, was a Pakistani militant who operated in Indian-administered Kashmir, Afghanistan and Pakistan.

Background
Farooqi was believed to have been involved in the 1995 kidnapping of Western tourists in Jammu and Kashmir, and under the alias Mansur Hasnain, was suspected to be one of the hijackers of Indian Airlines Flight 814, which was rerouted to Taliban-controlled Afghanistan in 1999.

He was allegedly involved in the murder of American journalist Daniel Pearl in 2002, and, along with Abu Faraj al-Libbi, the assassination attempts on Pakistani President Pervez Musharraf on 14 and 25 December 2003. Farooqi was also suspected of having been an associate of al-Qaeda terrorist Khalid Sheikh Mohammed.

Pakistani security forces launched a massive manhunt for Farooqi and other terrorists in May 2004, and eventually cornered him in his safehouse in Nawabshah, Sindh, where he was subsequently killed following a two-hour-long gunfight. 

Farooqi was a member of Jaish-e-Mohammed, an Islamic terrorist group that was founded by Pakistani militant Masood Azhar following his release by India as part of prisoner negotiations after the Taliban's hijacking of Indian Airlines Flight 814 in December 1999.

References

External links
AMJAD FAROOQI: THE UNTOLD STORY

1972 births
2004 deaths
Deaths by firearm in Sindh
Fugitives
Fugitives wanted by Pakistan
People shot dead by law enforcement officers in Pakistan
Terrorism in Pakistan